San Faustino is a station of the Brescia Metro, in the city of Brescia in northern Italy.

San Faustino is the first of two stations in the city centre for those arriving from the north. Being close to the University of Brescia, it is expected to be widely used by students. The discovery of the ruins of Venetian walls caused a slowdown of construction work in the area and reconsideration of the original station concept. Major design changes to the structure of the station resulted in the remains of the ancient walls being visible through a glass floor, however there are none of the typical pyramid skylights to bring daylight to the train platforms.

References

External links

Brescia Metro stations
Railway stations opened in 2013
2013 establishments in Italy
Railway stations in Italy opened in the 21st century